The Gold Sheet: Pro Football Analyst is software published by Villa Crespo Software in .

Gameplay
The Gold Sheet: Pro Football Analyst provided statistics for two full seasons of football, with the option to get a Statdisk with teams going back to 1983, and users had the ability to download updates weekly or receive hard copy updates by mail.

Reception
Bill Brown and Wyatt Lee reviewed the program for Computer Gaming World, and stated that "To be sure, The Gold Sheet: Pro Football Analyst is not a game, but this writer certainly felt like a Las Vegas radio personality when he finished analyzing last weekend's games. 61% accuracy may not be that good on GEnie, but it sure beats the 38% scored by one of the on-disk "experts." Anyone serious about sports and addicted to statistics will certainly want to be aware of The Gold Sheet."

Richard Jacobs for Computer Games Strategy Plus said "Gamblers will find that its array of stats and trends provide 'cause for pause' before wagering. But will this software make you rich? I wouldn't bet on it."

Reviews
VideoGames & Computer Entertainment

References

1991 video games
American football video games
DOS games
DOS-only games
Video games developed in the United States